Olivia Rogowska was the defending champion but chose not to participate.

Jang Su-jeong won the title, defeating Yuki Naito in the final, 6–7(3–7), 6–1, 6–4.

Seeds

Draw

Finals

Top half

Bottom half

References

Main Draw

ACT Clay Court International 2 - Singles